Anton Kern or Körne (12 December 1709 - 8 June 1747) was a Bohemian-born German painter; primarily of religious and historical scenes.

Biography
Kern was born in Tetschen, where his father Johannes was the town clerk. Rossi was sufficiently impressed to take him home to his studio in Dresden and give him lessons.   
 
In 1723, Rossi took him to Italy and secured him an apprenticeship with Giambattista Pittoni. He remained with Pittoni for seven years, although he also took lessons at various public and private schools. He returned to Bohemia in 1731, accompanied by Laurentio's brother, Ventura. Four years later, he was officially registered as a "Pictor" at the Faculty of Arts, Charles University in Prague.

In 1738, he was summoned to Dresden, where he received several commissions related to the wedding of Princess Maria Amalia and King Charles VII of Naples (later Charles III of Spain).  He made numerous sketches for altar and ceiling paintings at the court church that were never executed. That same year, Frederick Augustus II, the Elector of Saxony, presented him with a scholarship to study in Rome, where he may have worked with Francesco Trevisani. Upon his return in 1741, he was appointed a court painter. He died in Dresden.

His most important work there was an altarpiece featuring an enthroned Virgin Mary, surrounded by St. Anthony, St. John of Nepomuk and St. Wenceslaus; which shows the influence of Johann Christoph Lischka. In his last years, he turned to mythological subjects and developed stylistic elements that would later become part of the Rococo style. In 1747 he became ill, with an unknown ailment, and died the same day.

His older brother, Benedict (1704-c.1777), was also an artist and court painter in Saxony, who specialized in landscapes and restorations.

References

Further reading
 Klàra Garas (1969). Anton Kern (1710–1747). In: Kazimierz Michałowski, Jan Białostocki (eds.) (1969). Muzeum i twórca: Studia z historii sztuki i kultury ku czci Stanisława Lorentza. Warszawa: Państwowe Wydawnictwo naukowe. p. 65–89.
 Alice Binion (1981). Anton Kern in Venice. Münchner Jahrbuch der bildenden Kunst 32: 182–206.

External links

 More works by Kern @ ArtNet

1710 births
1747 deaths
German Bohemian people
18th-century German painters
18th-century German male artists
Court painters
People from Děčín